Thogummi is a village in East Godavari district of the Indian state of Andhra Pradesh. It is located in Kovvur mandal.

References 

Villages in East Godavari district